Rajound is a  city in Kaithal District of Haryana State in India.

This is an administrative block and sub-tehsil. Its population according to 2001 census is 15,335. Its male population is 8,147, and its female population is 7,188. Rajound is located on State Highway no. 11 at Kaithal-Assandh section. Frequent bus service at every 10 minutes from Kaithal to Rajound is available. The land around Rajound is fertile and well irrigated by canal water and tubewells, it is a major producer of wheat and rice.

Historical places in Rajound includes:

 Makhdum Peer and Raju Peer, on Rajound to Mandhwal Road
 Sultan Peer on Kotra Road
 Baba Bahadurban Mandir, in the middle of the village
 Shiv Mandir, near Baba Bahadurban Mandir
 Jahar Vir Goga Peer, on Kaithal Road
 Devi Mandir, near the general hospital and main bazaar

Places for education and other facilities:

 Govt. Schools - Govt Boys Sr. Sec. School, Govt Girls Sr. Sec. School, Govt. Pr. School
 Private Schools - Gold Life School, M.D. Sr. Sec. School, Birla open minds international school, Gian Deep Sr. Sec. School, S.P.N. School, S.D.M. School, 
 College & Other Institutes - Govt P.G. girls college (Proposed),Govt  I.T.I., Savitri Devi Memorial group of colleges for Pharmacy and Education, S.P.N. private I.T.I., M.D. college.
 Shehnai Garden Marriage Palace Jind Road, Sona Palace Kaithal Road, Punjabi Palace Kithana Road
Libraries-Study Space Library, Pundri road
Government offices and facilities:
 Block Education Office
 Sub Magistrate Office
 Post office
 Police Station
 Municipal Committee office
 ABRC office
 Govt Hospital
 Govt Veterinary Hospital
 Patwarkhana
 32 KV Substation
 Bus Stand

Notable people

Manoj Kumar, an Olympian, Arjuna awardee, and the world's 6th ranked boxer from Rajound.

References

External links
Kaithal district, official website

Cities and towns in Kaithal district